The 1989 Atlantic Coast Conference men's basketball tournament took place in Atlanta, Georgia, at the Omni Coliseum. North Carolina won the tournament by defeating Duke, 77–74, in the championship game. J. R. Reid of North Carolina was named tournament MVP.

Bracket

AP rankings at time of tournament

References

Tournament
ACC men's basketball tournament
Basketball competitions in Atlanta
College basketball tournaments in Georgia (U.S. state)
ACC men's basketball tournament
1980s in Atlanta
ACC men's basketball tournament